Amanda Margaret Cooper-Sarkar is an English particle physicist. She is an expert on deep inelastic scattering and parton distribution functions.

Education & Work
Cooper-Sarkar received her DPhil in particle physics from the University of Oxford in 1975. After working as an exchange fellow at the Tata Institute of Fundamental Research in Mumbai, India and then at the National Laboratory for High Energy Physics in Tsukuba, Japan, she returned to England as a research associate at the Rutherford Appleton Laboratory in Oxfordshire, in 1979. She became a senior fellow at CERN in Geneva in 1983, and a senior scientist at Rutherford in 1985.

She left academia to work at an educational institute in Bhopal, India, but in 1990, with the birth of her first child, she returned to Oxford with a plan to "combine undergraduate teaching with childcare, soft-peddling on the research". She became a Beale Fellow and Senior Tutor in Physics at St Hilda's College, Oxford. She later wrote that, although these steps delayed her research career by 10 or 15 years, they also allowed her to focus more single-mindedly on a single research topic, "which was ultimately what made me into a world expert in my field". In 2008 she became a professor of particle physics at the University of Oxford.
Cooper-Sarkar was part of the ZEUS collaboration, and is also part of the ATLAS collaboration.

Recognition and Awards
In 2009, Cooper-Sarkar won the Nuclear and Particle Physics Divisional Prize of the Institute of Physics.
She won the 2015 James Chadwick Medal and Prize "for her study of deep inelastic scattering of leptons on nuclei which has revealed the internal structure of the proton".

References

Living people
English physicists
English women physicists
Particle physicists
Alumni of the University of Oxford
Fellows of St Hilda's College, Oxford
Year of birth missing (living people)
People associated with CERN